Roxette was a Swedish pop rock duo, consisting of Marie Fredriksson (vocals and keyboards) and Per Gessle (vocals and guitar). Formed in 1986, the duo became an international act in the late 1980s, when they released their breakthrough second album Look Sharp! Their third album Joyride, released in 1991, became as successful as its predecessor. Roxette went on to achieve nineteen UK Top 40 hits, and several US Hot 100 hits, including four US number-ones with "The Look", "Listen to Your Heart", "It Must Have Been Love", featured on the soundtrack of Pretty Woman, and "Joyride". Their other hits include "Dressed for Success", "Dangerous", and "Fading Like a Flower".

Before coming together to form the duo, Fredriksson and Gessle were already established artists in Sweden. Fredriksson had released a number of solo albums and Gessle was the lead singer and songwriter of Gyllene Tider, a band which had three No. 1 albums. Acting on the advice of the managing director of their record label, the two joined to record "Neverending Love", which became a hit single in Sweden.

After the release of Don't Bore Us, Get to the Chorus!, a greatest hits record, the duo took a hiatus before returning with the albums Have a Nice Day (1999) and Room Service (2001). They continued to chart in other territories, mainly in Europe, Australia and Latin America, where they earned various Gold and Platinum awards until the beginning of the new millennium. In 2002, the duo took a break from recording and touring when Fredriksson was diagnosed with a brain tumour. Gessle went on to release solo albums and reunited with Gyllene Tider before Roxette took to the stage together again for the first time in eight years, in 2009, during Gessle's European Party Crasher tour. In 2011, they released Charm School, their first studio album in ten years, which was followed by Travelling in 2012. Their final studio album, Good Karma, was released in 2016. Marie Fredriksson died on 9 December 2019, at the age of 61, following a long battle with a brain tumour.

Their songs "It Must Have Been Love" and "Listen to Your Heart" continue to receive wide radio airplay, with both singles receiving awards from BMI in 2014 for achieving five million radio plays. They have sold an estimated 75 million records worldwide, with over 10 million in certified units from Germany, the US and the UK, achieving gold and platinum certifications for Joyride and Look Sharp! in all three regions. They are Sweden's second-best-selling music act after ABBA.

History

1979–1986: Formation 
Per Gessle and Marie Fredriksson first met in Halmstad, Sweden, in the late 1970s. Gessle fronted Gyllene Tider, one of Sweden's most popular bands at the time, and Fredriksson was in the less successful Strul and MaMas Barn (Mama's Children) before both embarked on solo careers. In 1981, Fredriksson sang for the first time with Gyllene Tider on stage and was featured as a background vocalist for a Swedish-language album the band released in 1982. Gessle also worked with ex-ABBA singer Frida, for a song that appeared on her 1982 album Something's Going On, setting music to a Dorothy Parker poem.

While working on her first solo album, Het vind (Hot Wind), Fredriksson performed more background vocals for Gyllene Tider's only album in English, The Heartland Café. The 11-track album was released in February 1984 and sold 45,000 copies in Sweden. According to Gessle, the group's first English-language release was in response to interest expressed by EMI's American label Capitol Records. Capitol took six of the tracks and released an extended play (EP) record in the US with an abridged title, Heartland, but the company insisted on a different name for the band. Gessle and the other members of Gyllene Tider (Swedish for "Golden Times" or "Golden Age") chose the title of a 1975 Dr. Feelgood song, "Roxette".

The newly named Roxette issued one near-invisible release in the US, "Teaser Japanese", whose video reached MTV's studio but received no rotation to speak of. It, and subsequent singles, fared better in Sweden, and Gyllene Tider briefly toured the country to support the album. However, "the album died soon enough and the international career died before it even started", Gessle wrote. "We decided to put Gyllene Tider to rest... until further notice." Gessle then turned to solo work, recording his second Swedish-language solo album, Scener, released in 1985 and again featuring Fredriksson on background vocals. While Fredriksson recorded her second solo album, Den sjunde vågen (The Seventh Wave).

It was then that the managing director of EMI, Rolf Nygren, suggested that Gessle and Fredriksson should sing together. Gessle translated a song called "Svarta glas" ("Black glasses") into English, which became their first single, "Neverending Love". It was released in the summer of 1986 under the name "Roxette" and reached the Swedish top 10, selling 50,000 copies.

1986–1988: Pearls of Passion 

After the success of "Neverending Love" in Sweden, Gessle and Fredriksson quickly recorded a full-length album, translating songs Gessle had written originally for his third solo album. With the release of Pearls of Passion in October 1986, Roxette maintained their commercial momentum in Sweden with their next singles "Goodbye to You" and "Soul Deep." Some singles from Passion were released in other countries, but these international releases failed to emulate their Swedish success. The album was followed by a compilation of remixes of the same songs, titled Dance Passion.

In 1987, Fredriksson released her third solo album Efter stormen (After the Storm). Meanwhile Roxette released the single "I Want You" in a collaboration with Eva Dahlgren and Ratata. Later in the saye ear,they released "It Must Have Been Love (Christmas For the Broken Hearted)" after EMI Germany asked the duo to come up with an intelligent Christmas single. The holiday-themed song received some attention in their native country as Roxette prepared their next album, though EMI Germany decided against releasing the single. Pearls of Passion was re-released internationally in 1997, and included "It Must Have Been Love (Christmas for the Broken Hearted)" as a bonus track.

1988–1990: Look Sharp! 
In the duo's native Sweden, "Dressed for Success" and "Listen to Your Heart" were chosen as the first two singles from their second album Look Sharp!, as Gessle and EMI Sweden chose to highlight Fredriksson's singing. Gessle said, "I always thought we should promote the songs Marie sang. Me being a lead singer wasn't part of the plan, not for me anyway." Both singles reached the top 10 of the Swedish singles chart, while the album, which was released in Sweden in October 1988, held the No. 1 position for 14 weeks. Music critic Måns Ivarsson was underwhelmed by the album, writing derisively: "To consist of two such original persons as Marie Fredriksson and Per Gessle, the album sounds unbelievably conventional. Most striking are the lyrics. Gessle's once so subtle Swedish lyrics have became desolate English nonsense." However, the album won Roxette their first Rockbjörnen awards in Sweden and Gessle his first Grammis award in the category Best Composer.

When the third single from Look Sharp!, "The Look", became another top 10 single in their home country, Roxette were still unknown internationally. While studying in Sweden an American exchange student from Minneapolis, Dean Cushman, heard "The Look" and brought a copy of Look Sharp! home for the 1988 holiday break. He gave the album to a Minneapolis radio station, KDWB 101.3 FM. The station started playing "The Look"; based on positive caller feedback, the song became very popular, and quickly spread to other radio stations. The song became a radio hit before any Roxette product had been commercially released or promoted in the US market. The story was covered by radio, newspapers and TV in the US and in Sweden. Fredriksson dismissed rumors that Cushman was paid to take the record to the radio station.

EMI had previously rejected Roxette as unsuitable for the American market and they did not have a recording contract there, but after the popularity of "The Look" in the US, EMI officials made the decision to release and market the single worldwide. "The Look" and pressed copies of Look Sharp! were issued in early 1989 to record stores and radio stations. "The Look" became their first No. 1 in the US on 8 April 1989, where it remained for one week. The breakthrough for Roxette became international when the song also topped the charts in 25 other countries, and at the end of the year, Billboard named "The Look" one of the 20 biggest Hot 100 singles of the year.

"Dressed for Success", featuring Fredriksson on lead vocals with Gessle singing short parts, was the second international single. The single peaked at No. 14 on the Hot 100 as well as at No. 3 in Australia. "Listen to Your Heart" was released thereafter; it differed from previous singles and instead resembled the guitar-heavy ballads of Heart. Spending a single week at No. 1 in the US in November 1989, it bore the distinction of being the first US Billboard Hot 100 No. 1 not to be commercially available on 7-inch vinyl.

A fourth single, "Dangerous", was released at the end of the year, entering the Hot 100 at the end of December. The single, a duet between Gessle and Fredriksson, spent two weeks at No. 2 on the Hot 100 in February 1990, and again becoming a worldwide success by reaching the top 10 in important music markets such as Germany and Australia. "Dangerous" was released as a double A-side single in the UK with "Listen to Your Heart".

"It Must Have Been Love" – Pretty Woman soundtrack 
It was around this time that Touchstone Pictures approached EMI and Roxette about contributing a song to the soundtrack of an upcoming film, Pretty Woman, starring Richard Gere and Julia Roberts. Gessle maintained that "It Must Have Been Love", by then a two-year-old recording, was chosen because Roxette had no time to compose and record a new song. The film's producers turned it down, asking for another song, but Gessle declined to produce another song. Some weeks later after re-editing the film before release, the producers re-requested "It Must Have Been Love", but Roxette had to remove the Christmas lyrics. Gessle and producer Clarence Öfwerman then took the old recording, had Fredriksson replace a single Christmas-reference line in the song and added some instrumentation and background vocal overlays.

Though it was not the first single released from the soundtrack, "It Must Have Been Love" would prove to be Roxette's most successful single release. The song spent two weeks at No. 1 on the Hot 100 in June 1990, three months after the film's release, and stayed for two additional weeks at No. 2, spending a total of seventeen weeks in the top 40. Billboard named the song the No. 2 Hot 100 single of the year, behind Wilson Phillips's "Hold On". The single also topped the charts in more than 20 other countries (including Australia) around the world. In Germany the single spent 9 months in the top 75, and peaked at No. 3 in the UK, the duo's highest singles chart position there. The soundtrack went on to be certified three times platinum by the RIAA.

1991–1992: Joyride 
As 1990 wound down, Roxette completed their tour and returned to Sweden to record their follow-up to Look Sharp! The 15-track collection titled Joyride, which was released in March 1991, became a critical and commercial success. It topped the charts in a number of countries and became Roxette's best selling album. Their record company EMI invested almost 2 million dollars on promotion for the album, which stayed at No. 1 in Germany for 13 weeks, while staying on the US album chart for over a year. J.D. Considine of Rolling Stone magazine reviewed Joyride: "By emphasizing its sense of personality, Roxette delivers more than just well-constructed hooks; this music has heart, something that makes even the catchiest melody more appealing." The album's success brought the duo two Rockbjörnen awards for Best Swedish Album and Best Swedish Group, the second time they had achieved that feat.

The single "Joyride" became Roxette's first No. 1 in their home country. It also topped the charts in more than 25 countries around the world, including Germany, Australia and the US; it was their fourth and last No. 1 in the US. The single also charted well in the UK, and achieved success in Canada, which resulted in the song being nominated in 1992 for a Juno Award in the category, Best Selling Single by a Foreign Artist. Its follow-up, "Fading Like a Flower (Every Time You Leave)", a power ballad similar to "Listen to Your Heart", with Fredriksson on lead, spent a week at No. 2 in the US in July and achieved success in other big markets as well.

Roxette then embarked on an ambitious worldwide tour. The Join the Joyride! World Tour 1991/92 tour eventually reached more than 1.5 million fans in 107 concerts around the world, including a few dates in the US. On reviewing their Universal Amphitheater performance, Dennis Hunt of the Los Angeles Times said, "Fredriksson is squandering her talents in pop's low-rent district. She's clearly superior to Roxette's uncomplicated, hook-crammed material..."

The end of 1991 saw the merger of SBK, Chrysalis and EMI record companies, to form EMI Records Group North America. The resulting merger saw many personnel changes that resulted in a downturn in publicity for Roxette. Though Joyride was certified platinum and made impressive worldwide sales, the subsequent singles from the album—the ballad "Spending My Time" and "Church of Your Heart"—failed to reach the heights of previous singles in the US charts.

In late 1991, the band was honoured with its own postage stamp in Sweden, along with Lena Philipsson and Jerry Williams.

Music tastes in the U.S. were changing, with the emergence of new genres such as new jack swing, grunge, harder-core rap and hip-hop. As William Ruhlmann of AllMusic later wrote, "Americans probably lost interest [in Roxette] at about the time that Nirvana came roaring in from the Northwest." In a 2009 interview with BBC News, Gessle highlighted the popularity of Nirvana and grunge music as a contributor to Roxette's downturn in success. Although Roxette's commercial momentum in America was slowing down dramatically, elsewhere, singles from the Joyride album continued to become hits when "Spending My Time" and "The Big L." charted in many countries.

1992–1993: Tourism 
Roxette continued the Join the Joyride tour into 1992. It was during this tour that most of the material for Tourism: Songs from Studios, Stages, Hotelrooms & Other Strange Places was recorded. Instead of releasing an album of brand-new material, Gessle and Fredriksson re-mastered older recordings, including several slated for, but not included on, Look Sharp! and Joyride. They also recorded some of their live performances, recorded a country music-inspired version of "It Must Have Been Love" in a Los Angeles studio, and recorded new material in various locations around the world – an empty dance club, a hotel room – and compiled everything on to the album. Released in October 1992, Gessle and Fredriksson said Tourism was meant to "capture the energy within the band".

The first single off the album was "How Do You Do!" followed by the ballad "Queen of Rain" and an electrified version of the song "Fingertips", originally recorded acoustically for the album and re-titled "Fingertips '93" for single release. Singles from Tourism barely dented the American radio and record charts but in the rest of the world, the first single "How Do You Do!", hit the top 5 in most European and South American countries. The album Tourism also charted well outside of the US, reaching No. 1 in Germany and Sweden, No. 2 in the UK as well as peaking at No. 3 in Australia. The duo's success reflected in an ECHO Award nomination for International Group of the Year. At home, Roxette won a Rockbjörnen Award for Best Swedish Group. It remains the last Rockbjörnen the duo received. In October 1992, Fredriksson released her first solo album in Swedish for five years, titled Den ständiga resan (The Eternal Journey).

In early 1993, Roxette became the first non-native-English speaking artists to be featured on MTV's Unplugged series, though the songs from the performance were never released on an official Unplugged album. In the same year, Roxette recorded and released "Almost Unreal", a song originally slated for the film Hocus Pocus starring Bette Midler. However, the song was moved to the soundtrack of the film based on the Nintendo video game Super Mario Bros. Supported by an expensive video and ultimately receiving respectable airplay, "Almost Unreal" managed to briefly reach the lower end of the Billboard Hot 100 but charted highest in the UK reaching the top 10, the group's first time there since "Joyride" two years before. Roxette themselves were dismissive about the song, with Fredriksson saying it was "not one of our most inspired moments." On the other hand, Gessle stated: "I still like the song in a way... but if you wanted to make a parody of Roxette, it would probably sound something like this." To coincide with the UK television premiere of the film Pretty Woman, "It Must Have Been Love" was re-issued in September 1993 and entered the UK and Irish singles charts for the second time.

1994–1998: Crash! Boom! Bang! and Don't Bore Us, Get to the Chorus! 
 Roxette changed their musical style with the 1994 release of Crash! Boom! Bang! Bryan Buss of Allmusic wrote, "They rock harder than on their pop-friendly albums prior to this, and the result shows growth but not the fun that made them so popular in the first place... Though the two have an edge on this album, they almost seem to have become a bit bored."

Although Crash! Boom! Bang! saw chart success (No. 1 in Sweden, No. 2 in Germany and No. 3 in Australia and the UK), it sold fewer copies than had their previous albums. EMI America were reluctant to release the album, and instead promoted a shortened 10-track Favorites CD in association with McDonald's. The Favorites of Crash! Boom! Bang! CD reportedly sold about 1 million copies. It was noted by journalists that the McDonald's promotion CD (and other CDs by Tina Turner, Garth Brooks and Elton John) led to US music retailers of the time being unhappy with the promotion for several reasons, including that it bypassed established music stores and that the price of the CD was way below normal wholesale costs. Some stores refused to sell the albums published by EMI, with one major chain protesting by temporarily pulling all products from CEMA (EMI's distribution wing) out of its sales and ad campaigns. The duo's relations with EMI's North American subsidiary, which had never been smooth, collapsed after the release of this album. Crash! Boom! Bang! became the last Roxette release EMI issued in the US until Greatest Hits was released in 2011 on subsidiary label Capitol Records.

The first single release from Crash! Boom! Bang! was "Sleeping in My Car". The distortion guitar-heavy pop song, born out of anger and frustration of the album's grown up nature, reached No. 2 in Canada, as well as the top 10 in 7 European countries (including No. 1 in Sweden) as well as the top 15 in the UK, Australia and Germany. However, in the US, it was less successful, reaching only No. 50 on the Billboard Hot 100 chart. Subsequent releases--the album's title selection, "Fireworks", and "Run to You"—were less successful but managed to reach the charts in some countries.

Roxette then embarked on another, albeit scaled-down, worldwide tour, skipping North America in the process. The "Crash! Boom! Bang! Tour" saw Roxette becoming the first Western band to be allowed to perform in China (Workers' Indoor Arena, Beijing) since Wham! in 1985. The procedure to get permission for this concert took over a year, and included self-censorship of lyrics. In 2008 they were ordered to pay 4.5 million kronor in unpaid taxes to the Swedish Tax Agency, for money earned during the German part of the 1994/95 tour.

In October 1995, Roxette released their first greatest hits compilation, Don't Bore Us, Get to the Chorus! This reached the top 5 in many European countries, including the UK, as well as the top 10 in Australia. It featured four new songs, three were released as singles, including the ballad "You Don't Understand Me", co-written by Desmond Child. Also that year, a compilation of demos, B-sides and remixes, alongside some of the 1993 MTV Unplugged material, was released in Japan and parts of South America under the title Rarities.

Gessle briefly reunited with Gyllene Tider in 1996, then Roxette took instrumental masters of many of its ballads and recorded translated Spanish lyrics over them. The resulting album, Baladas En Español, sold well in Spanish-speaking regions, reaching 2× platinum in Spain and platinum in Argentina. The single "Un día sin ti" ("Spending My Time") accompanied by a video directed by Jonas Åkerlund, became their first Latin Pop Airplay chart entry. The duo then released solo albums, I en tid som vår (In a Time Like Ours) by Fredriksson and The World According to Gessle by Gessle, with both charting in Sweden.

1999–2001: Have a Nice Day and Room Service 
Gessle and Fredriksson reunited in 1998 to record material for a new Roxette album, Have a Nice Day, which was released in February 1999 and gave Roxette a comeback in continental Europe. It entered at No. 1 in Sweden and No. 2 in Germany. The first single, "Wish I Could Fly", became their highest-charting UK single since 1993 (No. 11). In Sweden it charted at No. 4, their best position since "Sleeping in My Car". Although the second single, "Anyone", did not chart well in Europe, "Stars", the third single, charted well in Scandinavian and German-speaking countries. NMEs review called Have a Nice Day "...another clever-clever bastard of an album which defies Doctor Rock." A review of "I Wish I could Fly" written by Håkan Steen of Aftonbladet said, "The come-back single is a disappointment. The lyrics which conveys a sense of distance in a relationship, are not particularly engaging." The album, according to Billboard magazine, was under discussion for release in the US, but ultimately, it was not released there.

In 2000, Fredriksson released a greatest hits compilation called Äntligen (At Last), which went on to be a big seller in Sweden, peaking at No. 1 for three weeks. Meanwhile, Roxette signed a US distribution deal with Edel Music, which re-released Don't Bore Us, Get to the Chorus! In doing so, it replaced some non-US hits with songs from Have a Nice Day. To promote the release the duo did a small tour of The United States, performing at the Boston Mixfest and at the Virgin Megastore in Times Square. The single "Wish I Could Fly", included on the album, reached No. 27 on the Billboard Adult Contemporary chart and No. 40 on the Adult Top 40 chart.

Room Service followed in 2001, to a mixed response from critics. "Probably the best Roxette album since Joyride," wrote Leslie Mathew of Allmusic, "Room Service is an exciting, immediate, high-gloss pop gem that contains very little filler indeed." Per Bjurman from Swedish tabloid Aftonbladet was critical of the album. "It is not very good." he wrote. He did praise the three singles, "Real Sugar", "The Centre of the Heart", and "Milk and Toast and Honey", but he ended the review with the prediction: "Roxette is not finished. But soon, I suspect."

The album topped the Swedish charts and reached No. 3 in Germany, but it received little attention in the UK. A planned US release through Edel America Records did not happen as the label was disbanded due to financial difficulties, though it did peak at No. 2 on CNN's Worldbeat album chart. The first single, "The Centre of the Heart" topped the charts in Sweden, made the top 10 in Spain, and the top 15 in Finland. The other singles, "Real Sugar", the album's opening track and "Milk and Toast and Honey" were less successful. Roxette again went on tour, this time in Europe only, as concerts planned in South Africa were cancelled after the 11 September 2001 attacks. On reviewing their Löfbergs Lila Arena concert, Bjurman from Aftonbladet wrote, "Roxette succeed in all cases, to never leave the 80s." His review criticised Roxette's playlist, which consisted of some of their early hits. Johan Lindqvist from Göteborgs-Posten was more positive, scoring their Munich concert four stars out of five.

2002–2008: Compilations, solo albums and hiatus 
In 2002, at the Grammis ceremony, Roxette received a Music Export Prize from the Swedish Government. After that came a set of compilations, The Ballad Hits in late 2002 and The Pop Hits in early 2003. Each set contained a separate CD with material previously available and never heard before tracks. "A Thing About You" was released as the lead single from The Ballad Hits. The album was released in the UK on 14 February 2003 to coincide with Valentine's Day and entered the charts there at No. 23 before climbing to its peak position of No. 11 a week later. It also peaked in the top 10 in Germany and The Netherlands. The single "Opportunity Nox" was released from The Pop Hits in 2003. The Ballad Hits which sold over a million copies within a year, helped the duo win a World Music Award as the Best selling Scandinavian artist in October 2003. In that year, Roxette were also awarded with achievement medals by King Carl XVI Gustaf of Sweden "for appreciated achievements in Sweden and internationally".

In September 2002, Fredriksson was hospitalised due to suffering from a concussion after a fainting spell at her home. She was then diagnosed with a brain tumor, which was later successfully removed in surgery. Four months later, Swedish newspaper Expressen reported Fredriksson had been diagnosed with a second tumor. This turned out to be false; the newspaper issued an apology saying its report had no basis, but dismissed demands from Fredriksson for compensation. During her recovery, she recorded her first-ever English-language solo album, The Change. The album which was inspired by her brush with mortality, entered the Swedish album chart at No. 1 in October 2004. With Fredriksson's illness and rehabilitation, the duo took a hiatus, allowing Gessle to release Mazarin (Cupcake) in 2003. It was his first Swedish-language solo album in 18 years and became very successful in his home country, topping the charts and winning numerous awards. One of the tracks, "På promenad genom stan" ("Strolling Through the Town"), featured Fredriksson singing back-up. In 2004, Gessle and Gyllene Tider reunited for a 25th-anniversary celebration that included the band's first album in 20 years, Finn 5 fel!, and another successful tour in Sweden.

In 2005, Belgian dance group D.H.T.'s trance-cover of "Listen to Your Heart" became a worldwide club hit. Originally released in Belgium in 2003, by the mid-2005, the song reached the top 10 of the Billboard Hot 100, and was certified gold in October by the RIAA. Also that year, several songs were released as re-mixes and covers. Among them: two prominent versions of "Fading Like a Flower", one a trance cover by German group Mysterio and one a sampling by Dancing DJs that reached the UK chart. In November 2005, while Gessle was in the middle of promoting his Son of a Plumber album, he and Fredriksson appeared at the Dorchester Hotel in London for an awards presentation by Broadcast Music Incorporated (BMI). Gessle received two awards, the first for "It Must Have Been Love", which by that time had been played on US radio more than 4 million times, while he and co-songwriter Mats Persson also received an award for Dance Song of the Year for D.H.T.'s cover of "Listen to Your Heart". The ceremony marked the first time Gessle and Fredriksson had appeared in public together since before the onset of Fredriksson's brain tumour and subsequent surgery in 2002. When asked by an Aftonbladet reporter if there would be a Roxette reunion, Gessle replied, "We haven't decided yet. No doors are closed. We're still young". Fredriksson returned in 2006 with an album of Swedish cover songs, titled Min bäste vän (My Best Friend), while Gessle recorded two more solo albums, En händig man (A Handy Man) (2007) and Party Crasher (2008).

In mid-2006, Roxette released to radio "The Rox Medley" to promote a forthcoming 20th Anniversary package. The medley included six Roxette hit singles: "The Look", "Joyride", "Listen to Your Heart", "Dangerous", "It Must Have Been Love" and "Fading Like a Flower (Everytime You Leave)". It was eventually released as b-side to the single "One Wish" and was also available to download. The 20th Anniversary package better known as The Rox Box was released on 18 October 2006 to commemorate Roxette's 20 years in the music industry. Spanning over 4 CDs and single DVD, it included two new singles, "One Wish", which was their first new single in four years, and "Reveal". Both songs were also included on a new greatest hits album, A Collection of Roxette Hits: Their 20 Greatest Songs!, which was released at the same time as The Rox Box. Nunstedt of Expressen was disparaging of A Collection of Roxette Hits, giving the album two stars and ending the review, "...the CD subtitle Their Twenty greatest songs is a matter of discussion, I can only count eight hits."

2009–2010: Night of The Proms and European Tour 
Rumours started of a Roxette reunion when Gessle was interviewed by the BBC in April 2009. "Yeah, we've talked about it. It's really up to Marie." Gessle said. Online news sites also picked up on the possibility of a reunion. On 5 May 2009, an announcement was made that "Roxette would re-unite after 8 years and play for the first time on the Night of the Proms in Belgium, The Netherlands and Germany". The tour started on Friday, 23 October in the Sportpaleis Antwerp. Roxette were due to play the Night of the Proms back in 2002, but Fredriksson's illness meant they had to pull out.

Despite the Night of the Proms announcement, the first appearance of Roxette after eight years was on 6 May 2009, during Per Gessle's concert in Amsterdam as part of his Party Crasher tour. Almost at the end of the concert, Gessle said: "I'd like you all to welcome an old friend of mine: Marie Fredriksson", then she joined the band to perform "It Must Have Been Love" and "The Look". Later she also appeared on stage with him in Stockholm, at the last concert of his solo tour, 9 May 2009. Later in July 2009, they took part in the New Wave festival in Latvia.

In January 2010, a concert at The Race Legends event in Sweden on 14 August was announced, followed by confirmation of other concerts in Russia, Denmark and Norway which took place during August and September 2010. On 18 June 2010, Roxette performed a one-off set at Stockholm Concert Hall, performing "The Look" in front of Victoria, Crown Princess of Sweden, during the gala concert on the day before her wedding. On 4 August 2010, Roxette played a 2-hour secret gig at Leifs Lounge, Hotel Tylösand, just outside Halmstad. This was seen as a dress rehearsal for the upcoming European tour. On 31 December 2010, Roxette performed in Poland at New Year's Eve concert, transmitted live from Warsaw internationally.

2011–2012: Charm School, Travelling and World Tour 

On 23 October 2009, the Swedish newspaper Expressen reported that Roxette were recording new songs. Per stated that he had been working on new material for an upcoming album since May 2009. In early November 2010, it was announced that the band would undertake their first world tour since 1995. Their eighth studio album, Charm School, was released in Europe on 11 February 2011 and peaked within the top 20 of eleven European album charts. The set also became their first since 1992's Tourism to reach No. 1 on the German album chart, where it was certified gold for shipments in excess of 100,000 units. The album was preceded by the single "She's Got Nothing On (But the Radio)" on 10 January 2011, which became Roxette's biggest hit in the German market since "How Do You Do!", and for several weeks was the fourth most-played song on radio in the world. Charm School also received a full commercial release in South America, debuting at No. 1 on the Argentinian album chart. The Charm School World Tour, their first in 15 years, started on 28 February 2011 in Kazan, Russia. The tour eventually comprised 140 concerts plus three corporate gigs and ended on 9 September 2012 in Mexico City, with the band performing to over 800,000 people in the 77 concerts and two corporate gigs held in 2011 alone. On 15 November, Roxette played their first UK gig in 17 years at London's Wembley Arena, and in March 2012, they performed two concerts in China, after the Chinese Ministry of Culture gave them permission to play.

In early 2012, Gessle confirmed through his official Twitter account that recording for Roxette's ninth studio album, titled Travelling, had been completed. The fifteen-track album and the first single "It's Possible" was released in March 2012.

2013–2019: Continued touring, Good Karma and Fredriksson's death 
In 2013, Gessle reunited with his former band Gyllene Tider, who released a new album and toured Sweden, while Roxette issued their first Blu-ray/DVD concert, Live: Travelling the World. Fredriksson also released her eighth solo album, Nu!, which she promoted with a tour of Swedish concert halls. In April 2014, succeeding the announcement of the 25th anniversary of Roxette's first United States #1 hit "The Look" they announced that they would be embarking on new legs of "The Neverending World Tour", starting in Russia in late October 2014. "The Look (2015 Remake)", a new recording of their 1988 single, was released in July 2015. Roxette Diaries, a documentary directed by Jonas Åkerlund, was released on streaming services in March 2016.

On 18 April 2016, an official statement was released, cancelling the last leg of "The Neverending World Tour", due to concerns about Marie Fredriksson's health. Her doctors had advised her to refrain from playing live. She stated: "Sadly, now my touring days are over and I want to take this opportunity to thank our wonderful fans that (have) followed us on our long and winding journey." Gessle added: "The joyride on the road is over now – but we sure had fun, didn't we?" Roxette's tenth studio album, Good Karma, was released in June 2016. The record was preceded by its lead single, "It Just Happens", two months earlier. The album contains production from Swedish musicians Addeboy vs Cliff, with Gessle saying they were chosen to "inject new blood into the Roxette sound". Remixes aside, this was the first time that they had allowed anyone outside of the Roxette canon to produce new music. Per Gessle toured Europe in October and November 2018 as "Per Gessle's Roxette".  The set leant heavily on the band's back catalogue. In October 2018, Roxette released a 30th-anniversary edition of Look Sharp!, which contained a bonus disc of previously unreleased demos and outtakes.

Marie Fredriksson died on 9 December 2019, at the age of 61, following a long battle with a brain tumour. The day of her death, the music video for "It Must Have Been Love", posted on Roxette's official YouTube channel, had reached over 430 million views. Paying tribute to Fredriksson after her death, Gessle said she was "an outstanding musician, a master of the voice, an amazing performer."

2020–2022: Vault releases, Alsing's death, Rox RMX and Gessle's Roxette one-off reunion 

An album of previously unreleased outtakes, Bag of Trix, was released in December 2020. An outtake from the Good Karma sessions, "Let Your Heart Dance with Me" was released on 2 October. It was one of the final songs Fredriksson recorded before her death.

On 19 December 2020, Roxette's longtime drummer Per "Pelle" Alsing died at the age of 60. In 2021, Gessle convened a one-off reunion of the group called PG Roxette, which contributed a cover of the Metallica song "Nothing Else Matters" to the charity tribute album The Metallica Blacklist.

In 2021, Roxette released a 30th-anniversary edition of Joyride, which contained a bonus disc of previously unreleased demos and outtakes. Also in 2022, Roxette included new demos in the 30th-anniversary edition of Look Sharp!, but only in digital and streaming edition. In 2022, Roxette released a triple remix compilation album, called ROX RMX, which contained the most famous remixes of Roxette´s hits

2022: PG Roxette and Pop-Up Dynamo! 

In June 2022, Per Gessle, under the name PG Roxette, released a single called "The Loneliest Girl in the World". The single previews an album Gessle has recorded with members of Roxette's live touring band called Pop-Up Dynamo!. About this new "Roxette project" Per explained: "Since the 80s my whole life has revolved around Roxette and to this day that is what inspires me the most. There are millions of people out there who still love the band, so it's a matter of course for me to keep our music alive. At first I wasn't sure which way to go, but over time it became clear that I wanted to continue this fantastic "pleasure trip". I want to keep the Roxette legacy alive. I have written almost all the songs that Roxette recorded and they mean a lot to me. When I started writing, the ambition was to try and create a sibling to Look Sharp! and Joyride, and that's exactly what it sounds like. I wanted to make a modern production, but based on the well-known Roxette stucco. It is impossible to replace Marie and that has never been my intention either. It was a fantastic time and dream that we were able to share together. But it feels exciting to be able to continue this journey, albeit in a different way. If Marie had been alive, of course we would have done this together. I feel this is the right decision. I am proud of all that Roxette has done and I love working with these people."

In September 2022 PG Roxette released a second single called "Walking on Air", from PG Roxette's debut album, Pop-Up Dynamo!, which was released on 28 October 2022.

Awards 

|-
|rowspan=3|1988
|rowspan=2|Look Sharp
|Grammis (Sweden) – Composer of the Year (Gessle)
|
|-
|Rockbjörnen (Sweden) – Best Swedish Album
|
|-
|rowspan=2|Roxette
|Rockbjörnen (Sweden) – Best Swedish Group
|
|-
|rowspan=5|1989
| Smash Hits Poll Winners Party – Most Promising New Group
| 
|-
| rowspan=2|"The Look"
|MTV Video Award (USA) – International Viewer's Choice (Europe)
|
|-
| Music & Media Year-End Awards – Pan European Award
| 
|-
|rowspan=6|Roxette
|Rockbjörnen (Sweden) – Best Swedish Group
|
|-
|Silver Bravo Otto (Germany) – Best rock/pop Group
|
|-
|1990
|Bronze Bravo Otto – Best rock/pop group
|
|-
|rowspan=7|1991
|Brit Award (UK) – Best international group
|
|-
|Silver Bravo Otto – Best rock/pop group
|
|-
|Rockbjörnen (Sweden) – Best Swedish Group
|
|-
|rowspan=2|Joyride
|Rockbjörnen (Sweden) – Best Swedish Album
|
|-
|Grammis – Pop Group of the Year
|
|-
|"Joyride"
|MTV Video Award – International Viewer's Choice (Europe)
|
|-
|rowspan=3|Roxette
|Australian Music Awards – Most Popular International Group
|
|-
|rowspan=4|1992
|Gold Bravo Otto – Best rock/pop Group
|
|-
|Rockbjörnen (Sweden) – Best Swedish Group
|
|-
|"Joyride"
|Juno Award (Canada) – Best Selling Single by a Foreign Artist
|
|-
|rowspan=2|Roxette
|Echo (Germany) – International Group of the Year
|
|-
|rowspan=2|1993
|Echo (Germany) – International Group of the Year
|
|-
| Join the Joyride! Tour
| Hungarian Music Awards – Best Foreign Concert 
| 
|-
|1995
| Roxette
|Echo (Germany) – International Group of the Year
|
|-
|1999
|"Wish I Could Fly"
|Fono Music Award (Europe) – European No. 1 Airplay hit
|
|-
|2000
|rowspan=3|Roxette
|WMA – Best selling Scandinavian artist
|
|-
|2002
|Grammis (Sweden) – Government Music Export Prize
|
|-
|2003
|WMA – Best selling Scandinavian artist
|
|-
| 2006
| "Listen to Your Heart"
| BMI Pop Awards – Award-Winning Song
|  
|-
| 2007
| The Rox Box/Roxette 86–06
| Grammis (Sweden) – Best Compilation
|

Discography 

 Pearls of Passion (1986)
 Look Sharp! (1988)
 Joyride (1991)
 Tourism (1992)
 Crash! Boom! Bang! (1994)
 Have a Nice Day (1999)
 Room Service (2001)
 Charm School (2011)
 Travelling (2012)
 Good Karma (2016)
 Pop-Up Dynamo by PG Roxette (2022)

Tours 

 Rock runt riket  Swedish Tour  (1987)
 Look Sharp '88! Tour Swedish Tour (1988)
 Look Sharp Live! European Tour (1989)
 Join the Joyride! Tour (1991–92)
 Join the Summer Joyride – European Tour (1992)
 Crash! Boom! Bang! Tour (1994–95)
 Room Service Tour (2001)
 Night of the Proms (2009) (Classic meets Pop – headliner, with several artists)
 The Neverending World Tour (2009–16)
 Per Gessle's Roxette – European Tour (2018)

See also 

 Join the Flumeride –  a mockumentary of two fictional bands parodying Roxette and Gyllene Tider, and featuring a cameo appearance by Per Gessle.
 List of artists who reached number one in the United States
 List of bands named after other performers' songs
 List of Billboard number-one singles
 List of Swedes in music
 Swedish popular music

References

Citations

General sources

External links 

  
 
 
 Entry at 45cat.com

 
1986 establishments in Sweden
2019 disestablishments in Sweden
EMI Records artists
English-language singers from Sweden
Halmstad
Male–female musical duos
Musical groups disestablished in 2019
Musical groups established in 1986
Per Gessle
Pop music duos
Rock music duos
Swedish musical duos
Swedish pop rock music groups
World Music Awards winners
Female-fronted musical groups